Microvelia americana is a species of smaller water strider in the family Veliidae. It is found in North America.

References

Further reading

 
 

Veliidae
Articles created by Qbugbot
Insects described in 1884